Jonathan Joel Rodríguez (born March 30, 1994 in Córdoba, Argentina) is a professional Argentine footballer.

Club career
Raised in Argentinos Juniors youths, he made his debut in the first team on February 22, 2015, taking on 79' Martín Alaniz and scoring shortly after the final 1-1 goal against Club Atlético Colón.

On summer 2017, he signed a 2-year and a half contract with PAS Giannina. On December 19, 2017, he released from PAS Giannina. He didn't participate in any football match.

References

1994 births
Living people
Argentine footballers
Argentine expatriate footballers
Footballers from Córdoba, Argentina
Club Atlético Vélez Sarsfield footballers
Argentinos Juniors footballers
Chacarita Juniors footballers
Lobos BUAP footballers
Santiago Morning footballers
PAS Giannina F.C. players
Argentine Primera División players
Primera B de Chile players
Expatriate footballers in Chile
Expatriate footballers in Greece
Expatriate footballers in Mexico
Association football forwards
Argentine expatriate sportspeople in Greece
Argentine expatriate sportspeople in Mexico
Argentine expatriate sportspeople in Chile